Notocochlis cernica is a species of predatory sea snail, a marine gastropod mollusk in the family Naticidae, the moon snails.

Description
The length of the shell attains 15.7 mm.

Distribution
This species occurs in the Indian Ocean off Mauritius in the Mascarene Basin.

References

 Powell, A.W.B. (1971). New Zealand molluscan systematics with descriptions of new species: Part 7. Records of the Auckland Institute and Museum 8: 209–228.
 Drivas, J. & M. Jay (1988). Coquillages de La Réunion et de l'île Maurice 
 Hollman M. (2008) Naticidae. In Poppe G.T. (ed.) Philippine marine mollusks, vol. 1: 482-501, pls 186-195. Hackenheim: Conchbooks.
 Torigoe K. & Inaba A. (2011) Revision on the classification of Recent Naticidae. Bulletin of the Nishinomiya Shell Museum 7: 133 + 15 pp., 4 pls

External links
 Kabat A.R. (2000) Results of the Rumphius Biohistorical Expedition to Ambon (1990). Part 10. Mollusca, Gastropoda, Naticidae. Zoologische Mededelingen 73(25): 345-380
 Jousseaume, F. (1874). Description de quelques espèces nouvelles de coquilles appartenant aux genres Murex, Cypraea et Natica. Revue et Magasin de Zoologie. 3 (2): 3-25
 Rehder, H. A. 1980. The marine mollusks of Easter Island (Isla de Pascua) and Sala y Gómez. Smithsonian Contributions to Zoology 289:1-167, 15 figs., 14 pls. page(s): 64

cernica
Gastropods described in 1874